At the Scene is an album by the progressive bluegrass Maryland band The Seldom Scene.

Track listing 
 "A Girl I Know" (Phil Rosenthal) – 2:48
 "Jamaica, Say You Will" (Jackson Browne) – 3:27
 "Open up the Window, Noah" (Phil Rosenthal) – 2:23
 "Winter Wind" (Phil Rosenthal) – 2:42
 "Heal It" (Byron Hill, Mike Reid) – 3:41
 "The Weary Pilgrim" (Phil Rosenthal) – 2:43
 "It Turns Me Inside Out" (Jerry Crutchfield) – 3:30
 "The Champion" (Richard Landis) – 3:32
 "Born of the Wind" (Paul Craft) – 2:38
 "Peaceful Dreams" (Harold Douglas Handy) – 4:30
 "Let Our Mother Nature Have Her Way" (Clark, Southerland) – 3:07
 "I'll Remember You Love in My Prayers" (Hayes) – 3:04
 "Some Morning Soon" (Lynch) – 3:36

Personnel 
The Seldom Scene
 Phil Rosenthal - vocals, guitar, mandolin
 John Duffey - mandolin, vocals
 Ben Eldridge - banjo, guitar, vocals
 Mike Auldridge - Dobro, guitar, vocals
 Tom Gray - bass, vocals
with:
 Robbie Magruder - drums
 Jimmy Arnold - violin, harmonica
Technical
Raymond Simone - cover design
Jim McGuire - photography

References

External links 
 Official site

1983 albums
The Seldom Scene albums
Sugar Hill Records albums